Myra Weisberg Sklarew (born 1934 Baltimore, Maryland) is an American biologist, poet and teacher.

Life
She received a biology degree from Tufts University, in 1956.  She studied bacterial genetics and bacterial viruses with Salvador Luria and Max Delbrück at the Cold Spring Harbor Laboratory.  She later studied with Elliott Coleman at the Johns Hopkins University Writing Seminars, where she received an M.A. in 1970. She has worked in the Department of Neurophysiology, at Yale University School of Medicine, where she studied frontal lobe function and delayed response memory in Rhesus monkeys.

Sklarew is the author of three chapbooks, and six collections of poetry.  From 1987 to 1991, she served as president of the Yaddo artist community.  Her poems are in the Contemporary Poets Archive at the Library of Congress.

In 1961, she moved to Washington, D.C., and began teaching at American University. Sklarew is currently emerita professor of literature in the writing program at American University. Her papers are in the University of Maryland Archives.

Bibliography
A survivor named trauma: Holocaust memory in Lithuania (SUNY Press, forthcoming)
If You Want to Live Forever Chapbook, 2012, in Ashes Caught on the Edge of Light, Winterhawk Press
Harmless (Mayapple Press, 2010), 
The Journey of Child Development: Selected Papers of Dr. Joseph Nospitz, Routledge, 2010, co-editor with Bruce Sklarew
 Over the Rooftops of Time: Jewish Stories, Essays, Poems (SUNY Press, 2002) 
The Witness Trees: Poetry and Essays (Cornwall Books, 2000) 
Lithuania: New & Selected Poems (Azul Editions, 1995, 1997), 
Like a Field Riddled by Ants (Lost Road Publishers, 1987), 
Altamira (Washington Writers Publishing House, 1987), 
The Travels of the Itinerant Freda Aharon, Watermark Press, 1985 (chapbook)
The Science of Goodbyes (University of Georgia Press, 1982), 
From the Backyard of the Diaspora (Dryad Press, 1981), 
In The Basket of the Blind (Cherry Valley Editions, 1975)

Awards 

 1977: National Jewish Book Award in the English Poetry category for From the Backyard of the Diaspora

References

External links
Monuments by Myra Sklarew
Harmless by Myra Sklarew at Mayapple Press
Dryad Press records at University of Maryland Libraries.  This collection contains correspondence, publication materials, and manuscripts from Sklarew.

1934 births
Living people
21st-century American biologists
Tufts University School of Arts and Sciences alumni
Johns Hopkins University alumni
Yale School of Medicine faculty
Writers from Baltimore
Poets from Maryland
American University faculty and staff
Poets from Washington, D.C.
American women poets
Chapbook writers
21st-century American women writers
American women academics